The Eurovision Young Musicians 2000 was the tenth edition of the Eurovision Young Musicians, held at Grieg Hall in Bergen, Norway on 15 June 2000. Organised by the European Broadcasting Union (EBU) and host broadcaster Norsk rikskringkasting (NRK), musicians from eight countries participated in the televised final. A total of eighteen countries took part in the competition. All participants performed a classical piece of their choice accompanied by the Bergen Philharmonic Orchestra, conducted by Simone Young. Seven countries returned to the contest, while ,  and  withdrew from the 2000 contest.

Stanisław Drzewiecki of Poland won the contest, with Finland and Russia placing second and third respectively.

Location

The Grieg Hall, a 1,500-seat concert hall in Bergen, Norway, was the host venue for the 2000 edition of the Eurovision Young Musicians.  It has been the home of the Bergen Philharmonic Orchestra since the hall's completion in 1978.

It hosted the Eurovision Song Contest 1986, and is the host of the annual Norwegian Brass Band Championship competition, which occurs in mid-winter.  The hall is named after Bergen-born composer Edvard Grieg, who was music director of the Bergen Philharmonic Orchestra from 1880 until 1882.

Format
Arild Erikstad was the host of the 2000 contest. Norwegian jazz band The Brazz Brothers performed during the interval.

Results

Preliminary round
A total of eighteen countries took part in the preliminary round of the 2000 contest, of which eight qualified to the televised grand final. The following countries failed to qualify.

Final 
Awards were given to the top three countries. The table below highlights these using gold, silver, and bronze. The placing results of the remaining participants is unknown and never made public by the European Broadcasting Union.

Jury members
The jury members consisted of the following:

 – Esa-Pekka Salonen
 – Michael Thompson
 – Beata Schanda
 – Michael Collins
 – Boris Kuschnir
 – Evelyn Glennie
 – Leif Ove Andsnes

Broadcasting
EBU members from the following countries broadcast the final round. Croatia, Denmark, Sweden and Turkey broadcast the contest in addition to the competing countries.

See also
 Eurovision Song Contest 2000

References

External links 
 

Eurovision Young Musicians by year
2000 in music
2000 in Norwegian music
Music festivals in Norway
Events in Bergen
June 2000 events in Europe